Kenilworth and Southam is a constituency in Warwickshire, England represented in the House of Commons of the UK Parliament since 2010 by Jeremy Wright, a Conservative who served as Culture Secretary until 24 July 2019, having previously served as Attorney General for England and Wales from 2014 to 2018.

Members of Parliament

Constituency profile
The seat is overwhelmingly rural; most properties have large plots and a substantial majority are semi-detached or detached. This is geographically one of the largest seats in the West Midlands and one of its safest Conservative seats.

The historic town of Kenilworth, with a population of around 23,000, is the largest settlement in the area, with the small town of Southam (6,500) second. There are plenty of small villages, hamlets and farms elsewhere.

The seat surrounds the much more urban Warwick and Leamington constituency on three sides. It also borders southern Coventry; Coventry Airport is just within in the constituency.

Boundaries

The District of Warwick wards of Abbey, Cubbington, Lapworth, Leek Wootton, Park Hill, Radford Semele, St John's, and Stoneleigh, the District of Stratford-on-Avon wards of Burton Dassett, Fenny Compton, Harbury, Kineton, Long Itchington, Southam, Stockton and Napton, and Wellesbourne, and the Borough of Rugby wards of Dunchurch and Knightlow, Leam Valley, and Ryton-on-Dunsmore.

Following their review of parliamentary representation in Warwickshire, the Boundary Commission created this new constituency, pairing Kenilworth and Southam and breaking the parliamentary link between Rugby and Kenilworth established in 1983.

History
The constituency was created for the 2010 general election.  The result from 2005 for its wards (nominal result as the constituency was not then formed) gave a Conservative majority of 24.8%.

Elections

See also
 List of parliamentary constituencies in Warwickshire

Notes

References

Kenilworth
Parliamentary constituencies in Warwickshire
Constituencies of the Parliament of the United Kingdom established in 2010